Duncan Campbell  (born 23 January 1997) is a New Zealand snowboarder who competes internationally.
 
He was selected to participate in the 2018 Winter Olympics, in men's snowboard cross.

References

1997 births
Living people
New Zealand male snowboarders 
Olympic snowboarders of New Zealand
Snowboarders at the 2018 Winter Olympics